The following are notable boarding schools in the United States.

by state/territory

Alabama

Alaska
 Galena Interior Learning Academy
 Nenana Student Living Center
Mt. Edgecumbe High School (Sitka)

Arizona

Arkansas

California

Colorado

Connecticut

Delaware

District of Columbia

Florida

Georgia

Hawaii

Idaho 

 Rocky Mountain Academy
 Boulder Creek Academy
 North West Academy

Illinois

Indiana

Iowa
 Iowa School for the Deaf
Maharishi School of the Age of Enlightenment (Fairfield)
Scattergood Friends School (West Branch)

Kansas

Kentucky

Louisiana

Maine

Maryland

Massachusetts

Michigan

Minnesota

Mississippi

Missouri

 Missouri Academy of Science, Mathematics and Computing
Missouri Military Academy (Mexico)
 Missouri School for the Deaf

Montana

Nebraska

New Hampshire

New Jersey

New Mexico

New York

North Carolina

North Dakota
 Circle of Nations Wahpeton Indian School
 North Dakota School for the Deaf
 North Dakota Vision Services/School for the Blind

Ohio

Oklahoma 

 Brush Creek Academy (Jay)
 Jones Academy - Boarding school for grades 1-6, dormitory only for grades 7-12
New Lifehouse Academy (Disney)
Oklahoma Academy (Harrah)
 Oklahoma School for the Blind
Oklahoma School for the Deaf (Sulphur)
Oklahoma School of Science and Mathematics (Oklahoma City)
Riverside Indian School
Sequoyah High School (near Tahlequah)

Oregon

Pennsylvania

Puerto Rico

Rhode Island

South Carolina

South Dakota
 Cheyenne-Eagle Butte School
 Crow Creek Tribal School
 Flandreau Indian School
 Marty Indian School
 Pierre Indian Learning Center
 Pine Ridge School
 South Dakota School for the Blind and Visually Impaired

Tennessee

Texas

Utah

Vermont

Virginia

Washington

West Virginia

Wisconsin

Former boarding schools
 Closed
 Phoenix Indian School (Arizona)
 Iowa Braille and Sight Saving School
 Michigan School for the Blind
 Albuquerque Indian School (New Mexico)
 Native American Preparatory School (San Miguel County, New Mexico (Closed 2002)
 Central North Carolina School for the Deaf
 Hopevale Union Free School District (boarding ended in 2010, merged into Randolph Academy UFSD in 2011)
 Nebraska School for the Deaf
 Oregon School for the Blind
 Oakley School (Oakley, Utah)
 Carlisle Indian Industrial School (Pennsylvania)
 Scranton State School for the Deaf (Pennsylvania)
 South Dakota School for the Deaf (dorms closed in 2005, later closed entirely)
 Texas Blind, Deaf, and Orphan School
 Virginia School for the Deaf, Blind and Multi-Disabled at Hampton
 Wyoming School for the Deaf

 Still open, dormitories closed
 Rock Point Community School (Arizona)
 Governor Baxter School for the Deaf (Maine)
 Northern Cheyenne Tribal School (Montana)
 Rhode Island School for the Deaf

 Still boarding children, but no longer functions as an in-house school
 Saint Basil Academy - In-house school functions ended in 1997

See also
Lists of schools in the United States
List of boarding schools
List of international schools in the United States
Therapeutic boarding school

References

 
Boarding
United States